Poimenesperus velutinus is a species of beetle in the family Cerambycidae. It was described by White in 1858, originally under the genus Phryneta.

References

velutinus
Beetles described in 1858